The 1991–92 NBA season was the Lakers' 44th season in the National Basketball Association, and 32nd in the city of Los Angeles. This was the start of a new era for the Los Angeles Lakers, as they were coming from an NBA Finals defeat to the Chicago Bulls in five games, but also with the sudden retirement of their long-time superstar, Magic Johnson, after he announced that he was HIV positive. Johnson would briefly come back and play in the 1992 NBA All-Star Game in Orlando despite controversy; he was selected along with teammate James Worthy, and won the All-Star MVP award, as the Western Conference defeated the Eastern Conference, 153–113.

During the off-season, the Lakers acquired Sedale Threatt from the Seattle SuperSonics. Starting the season without Johnson for the first time since 1979, the Lakers won 10 of their first 13 games, including a nine-game winning streak, and held a 28–18 record at the All-Star break. However, they struggled in February, losing seven straight games and posting a 3–9 record during the month. The Lakers ultimately finished sixth in the Pacific Division with a 43–39 record, which was their worst record since the 1975–76 season.

Worthy averaged 19.9 points, 5.6 rebounds, 4.7 assists and 1.4 steals per game, but only played 54 games due to a knee injury, while Sam Perkins averaged 16.5 points and 8.8 rebounds per game, and Threatt provided the team with 15.1 points, 7.2 assists and 2.0 steals. In addition, Byron Scott averaged 14.9 points and 1.3 steals per game, while A.C. Green provided the team with 13.6 points and 9.3 rebounds per game, Vlade Divac contributed 11.3 points, 6.9 rebounds and 1.5 steals per game, but only played just 36 games due to a back injury, and sixth man Terry Teagle averaged 10.7 points per game off the bench.

As the #8 seed in the Western Conference, the Lakers were defeated in the Western Conference First Round of the playoffs by the Portland Trail Blazers, 3–1. The Blazers would lose in six games to the defending champion Chicago Bulls in the NBA Finals. Following the season, head coach Mike Dunleavy left and took a coaching job with the Milwaukee Bucks, and Teagle was released to free agency.

Draft picks

Roster

Regular season

Season standings

y - clinched division title
x - clinched playoff spot

z - clinched division title
y - clinched division title
x - clinched playoff spot

Record vs. opponents
The Lakers were the first team in NBA history to start the season with three straight overtime games, with their season opener being a double-overtime loss to the Houston Rockets. They went 1-2 during that time. After a third loss, to the Phoenix Suns, they went on a nine-game winning streak to finish November with an 11-4 record, which would be their longest winning streak of the season. They struggled in February, going 3-9, with a seven-game losing streak. They would finish the season with a 43-39 record, placing sixth in the Pacific Division and clinching the eighth and final seed for the playoffs.

Game log

Regular season

|- style="background:#fcc;"
| 1
| November 1
| @ Houston
| L 121-126 (2OT)
| James Worthy (37)
| A.C. Green (16)
| James Worthy (7)
| The Summit16,611
| 0-1
|- style="background:#cfc;"
| 2
| November 2
| @ Dallas
| W 114-113 (OT)
| James Worthy (30)
| Sedale Threatt (10)
| James Worthy (14)
| Reunion Arena17,502
| 1-1
|- style="background:#fcc;"
| 3
| November 5
| L.A. Clippers
| L 109-114 (OT)
| Sedale Threatt (25)
| Elden Campbell (12)
| Sedale Threatt (8)
| Great Western Forum16,618
| 1-2
|- style="background:#fcc;"
| 4
| November 8
| @ Phoenix
| L 85-113
| Terry Teagle (19)
| Elden Campbell (14)
| James Worthy (5)
| Arizona Veterans Memorial Coliseum14,496
| 1-3
|- style="background:#cfc;"
| 5
| November 10
| Minnesota
| W 96-86
| Sedale Threatt (27)
| James Worthy (14)
| Sedale Threatt (9)
| Great Western Forum16,833
| 2-3
|- style="background:#cfc;"
| 6
| November 14
| @ Golden State
| W 115-112
| Threatt & Worthy (21)
| Sam Perkins (10)
| Sedale Threatt (6)
| Oakland-Alameda County Coliseum Arena15,025
| 3-3
|- style="background:#cfc;"
| 7
| November 15
| Houston
| W 86-74
| James Worthy (22)
| Sam Perkins (11)
| Sedale Threatt (10)
| Great Western Forum16,956
| 4-3
|- style="background:#cfc;"
| 8
| November 17
| Atlanta
| W 111-89
| A.C. Green (26)
| Vlade Divac (13)
| Smith & Threatt (8)
| Great Western Forum16,750
| 5-3
|- style="background:#cfc;"
| 9
| November 19
| Phoenix
| W 103-95
| James Worthy (22)
| Sedale Threatt (8)
| Sedale Threatt (7)
| Great Western Forum16,558
| 6-3
|- style="background:#cfc;"
| 10
| November 22
| San Antonio
| W 98-96
| Scott & Threatt (18)
| Vlade Divac (11)
| Sedale Threatt (8)
| Great Western Forum17,505
| 7-3
|- style="background:#cfc;"
| 11
| November 24
| Milwaukee
| W 102-97
| A.C. Green (25)
| A.C. Green (7)
| Sedale Threatt (10)
| Great Western Forum16,820
| 8-3
|- style="background:#cfc;"
| 12
| November 26
| @ Orlando
| W 98-87
| James Worthy (25)
| Elden Campbell (11)
| Sedale Threatt (8)
| Orlando Arena15,151
| 9-3
|- style="background:#cfc;"
| 13
| November 27
| @ Miami
| W 89-87
| Byron Scott (23)
| Green & Perkins (8)
| James Worthy (5)
| Miami Arena15,008
| 10-3
|- style="background:#fcc;"
| 14
| November 29
| @ Boston
| L 91-114
| James Worthy (27)
| Green & Perkins (12)
| Sedale Threatt (6)
| Boston Garden14,890
| 10-4
|- style="background:#cfc;"
| 15
| November 30
| @ Philadelphia
| W 93-91
| Sam Perkins (17)
| Jack Haley (10)
| Sedale Threatt (10)
| The Spectrum18,168
| 11-4

|- style="background:#fcc;"
| 16
| December 3
| @ Milwaukee
| L 94-126
| A.C. Green (24)
| A.C. Green (6)
| Green & Worthy (3)
| Bradley Center17,739
| 11-5
|- style="background:#fcc;"
| 17
| December 4
| @ Charlotte
| L 106-124
| James Worthy (28)
| A.C. Green (9)
| Sedale Threatt (10)
| Charlotte Coliseum23,698
| 11-6
|- style="background:#cfc;"
| 18
| December 6
| @ New Jersey
| W 98-89
| Perkins & Worthy (22)
| Sam Perkins (14)
| Rory Sparrow (4)
| Brendan Byrne Arena16,384
| 12-6
|- style="background:#cfc;"
| 19
| December 8
| Dallas
| W 103-88
| Green & Scott (16)
| Sam Perkins (11)
| Sedale Threatt (9)
| Great Western Forum15,988
| 13-6
|- style="background:#cfc;"
| 20
| December 10
| @ Sacramento
| W 92-90
| Byron Scott (26)
| A.C. Green (14)
| Sedale Threatt (13)
| ARCO Arena17,014
| 14-6
|- style="background:#fcc;"
| 21
| December 11
| Utah
| L 95-101
| James Worthy (33)
| Sam Perkins (7)
| Sedale Threatt (12)
| Great Western Forum16,932
| 14-7
|- style="background:#cfc;"
| 22
| December 15
| Sacramento
| W 110-94
| Sam Perkins (23)
| Sam Perkins (13)
| James Worthy (8)
| Great Western Forum16,131
| 15-7
|- style="background:#cfc;"
| 23
| December 17
| @ Chicago
| W 102-89
| James Worthy (25)
| Sam Perkins (10)
| Sedale Threatt (9)
| Chicago Stadium18,676
| 16-7
|- style="background:#fcc;"
| 24
| December 19
| @ Minnesota
| L 85-93
| Perkins & Worthy (22)
| A.C. Green (11)
| Sedale Threatt (6)
| Target Center18,402
| 16-8
|- style="background:#fcc;"
| 25
| December 20
| @ Detroit
| L 93-112
| Byron Scott (20)
| Sam Perkins (10)
| Rory Sparrow (9)
| The Palace of Auburn Hills21,454
| 16-9
|- style="background:#fcc;"
| 26
| December 22
| Phoenix
| L 88-100
| Sam Perkins (28)
| A.C. Green (13)
| Threatt & Worthy (8)
| Great Western Forum17,505
| 16-10
|- style="background:#cfc;"
| 27
| December 25
| @ L.A. Clippers
| W 85-75
| A.C. Green (20)
| Green & Scott (11)
| Sedale Threatt (6)
| Los Angeles Memorial Sports Arena15,800
| 17-10
|- style="background:#fcc;"
| 28
| December 28
| Portland
| L 88-98
| James Worthy (21)
| A.C. Green (14)
| Sedale Threatt (6)
| Great Western Forum17,505
| 17-11
|- style="background:#fcc;"
| 29
| December 30
| Golden State
| L 99-114
| Sam Perkins (23)
| Sam Perkins (7)
| Threatt & Worthy (7)
| Great Western Forum17,505
| 17-12

|- style="background:#fcc;"
| 30
| January 3
| Indiana
| L 87-114
| Sam Perkins (15)
| Sam Perkins (9)
| James Worthy (8)
| Great Western Forum17,280
| 17-13
|- style="background:#cfc;"
| 31
| January 5
| Miami
| W 123-111
| James Worthy (33)
| A.C. Green (11)
| Sedale Threatt (10)
| Great Western Forum16,530
| 18-13
|- style="background:#cfc;"
| 32
| January 7
| @ Dallas
| W 104-80
| Terry Teagle (19)
| Sam Perkins (13)
| Rory Sparrow (6)
| Reunion Arena17,083
| 19-13
|- style="background:#fcc;"
| 33
| January 8
| @ San Antonio
| L 87-103
| Sedale Threatt (17)
| A.C. Green (11)
| Scott & Worthy (3)
| HemisFair Arena16,057
| 19-14
|- style="background:#cfc;"
| 34
| January 10
| Denver
| W 102-88
| James Worthy (26)
| A.C. Green (12)
| Sedale Threatt (11)
| Great Western Forum17,000
| 20-14
|- style="background:#cfc;"
| 35
| January 12
| Orlando
| W 112-99
| Byron Scott (31)
| Sam Perkins (15)
| Sedale Threatt (11)
| Great Western Forum16,119
| 21-14
|- style="background:#cfc;"
| 36
| January 15
| Charlotte
| W 95-93
| James Worthy (22)
| A.C. Green (15)
| Sedale Threatt (12)
| Great Western Forum16,736
| 22-14
|- style="background:#fcc;"
| 37
| January 18
| @ Seattle
| L 108-122
| James Worthy (27)
| Sam Perkins (9)
| Scott & Threatt (4)
| Seattle Center Coliseum14,533
| 22-15
|- style="background:#cfc;"
| 38
| January 20
| Seattle
| W 116-110
| Sam Perkins (25)
| A.C. Green (16)
| Rory Sparrow (7)
| Great Western Forum17,236
| 23-15
|- style="background:#fcc;"
| 39
| January 21
| @ Portland
| L 92-131
| Sam Perkins (18)
| A.C. Green (10)
| Sedale Threatt (8)
| Memorial Coliseum12,888
| 23-16
|- style="background:#cfc;"
| 40
| January 23
| @ Sacramento
| W 108-105
| Sedale Threatt (29)
| A.C. Green (14)
| Sedale Threatt (5)
| ARCO Arena17,014
| 24-16
|- style="background:#cfc;"
| 41
| January 24
| Sacramento
| W 95-92
| Scott & Teagle (22)
| Sam Perkins (14)
| Sedale Threatt (8)
| Great Western Forum16,949
| 25-16
|- style="background:#cfc;"
| 42
| January 29
| Golden State
| W 112-99
| James Worthy (21)
| A.C. Green (12)
| Sedale Threatt (5)
| Great Western Forum17,041
| 26-16
|- style="background:#cfc;"
| 43
| January 30
| @ Denver
| W 106-96
| Byron Scott (28)
| A.C. Green (9)
| Sedale Threatt (5)
| McNichols Sports Arena14,707
| 27-16

|- style="background:#fcc;"
| 44
| February 2
| Chicago
| L 97-103
| Green & Perkins (25)
| Sam Perkins (11)
| Sedale Threatt (8)
| Great Western Forum17,505
| 27-17
|- style="background:#fcc;"
| 45
| February 3
| @ Phoenix
| L 104-113
| Sedale Threatt (27)
| Elden Campbell (10)
| Sedale Threatt (5)
| Arizona Veterans Memorial Coliseum14,496
| 27-18
|- style="background:#cfc;"
| 46
| February 5
| L.A. Clippers
| W 100-95
| Sam Perkins (25)
| A.C. Green (9)
| Sedale Threatt (11)
| Great Western Forum17,049
| 28-18
|- align="center"
|colspan="9" bgcolor="#bbcaff"|All-Star Break
|- style="background:#cfc;"
|- bgcolor="#bbffbb"
|- style="background:#cfc;"
| 47
| February 11
| @ Minnesota
| W 116-108
| Sam Perkins (27)
| Sam Perkins (17)
| Sedale Threatt (12)
| Target Center19,006
| 29-18
|- style="background:#fcc;"
| 48
| February 13
| @ Utah
| L 91-97
| James Worthy (24)
| A.C. Green (11)
| Threatt & Worthy (4)
| Delta Center19,911
| 29-19
|- style="background:#fcc;"
| 49
| February 14
| Washington
| L 92-108
| Sam Perkins (17)
| A.C. Green (13)
| James Worthy (6)
| Great Western Forum16,852
| 29-20
|- style="background:#fcc;"
| 50
| February 16
| Boston
| L 107-114
| James Worthy (24)
| Sam Perkins (13)
| James Worthy (8)
| Great Western Forum17,505
| 29-21
|- style="background:#fcc;"
| 51
| February 17
| @ Golden State
| L 100-116
| James Worthy (23)
| A.C. Green (13)
| Sedale Threatt (7)
| Oakland-Alameda County Coliseum Arena15,025
| 29-22
|- style="background:#fcc;"
| 52
| February 19
| @ L.A. Clippers
| L 94-125
| Sedale Threatt (16)
| Chucky Brown (7)
| Sedale Threatt (4)
| Los Angeles Memorial Sports Arena15,800
| 29-23
|- style="background:#fcc;"
| 53
| February 20
| @ Seattle
| L 103-105
| Sedale Threatt (23)
| A.C. Green (15)
| Sedale Threatt (6)
| Seattle Center Coliseum30,847
| 29-24
|- style="background:#fcc;"
| 54
| February 22
| Golden State
| L 124-126
| Sam Perkins (26)
| Sam Perkins (12)
| Sedale Threatt (10)
| Great Western Forum17,505
| 29-25
|- style="background:#cfc;"
| 55
| February 26
| New York
| W 81-68
| James Worthy (27)
| Green & Perkins (9)
| Perkins & Scott (6)
| Great Western Forum17,505
| 30-25
|- style="background:#fcc;"
| 56
| February 28
| Cleveland
| L 90-101
| Perkins & Scott (20)
| Sam Perkins (11)
| Sedale Threatt (8)
| Great Western Forum17,505
| 30-26

|- style="background:#fcc;"
| 57
| March 1
| Houston
| L 97-105
| Sam Perkins (21)
| A.C. Green (7)
| Byron Scott (8)
| Great Western Forum16,908
| 30-27
|- style="background:#fcc;"
| 58
| March 3
| @ Portland
| L 101-105
| Elden Campbell (25)
| A.C. Green (10)
| Sedale Threatt (8)
| Memorial Coliseum12,888
| 30-28
|- style="background:#cfc;"
| 59
| March 4
| New Jersey
| W 101-92
| Byron Scott (25)
| Sam Perkins (12)
| Sam Perkins (6)
| Great Western Forum17,215
| 31-28
|- style="background:#fcc;"
| 60
| March 8
| Detroit
| L 93-98
| A.C. Green (19)
| Green & Perkins (12)
| Sedale Threatt (9)
| Great Western Forum17,505
| 31-29
|- style="background:#cfc;"
| 61
| March 10
| @ New York
| W 106-104
| Sedale Threatt (42)
| Sam Perkins (11)
| Sedale Threatt (6)
| Madison Square Garden19,763
| 32-29
|- style="background:#cfc;"
| 62
| March 11
| @ Atlanta
| W 109-98
| Byron Scott (29)
| A.C. Green (11)
| Sedale Threatt (10)
| Omni Coliseum15,539
| 33-29
|- style="background:#fcc;"
| 63
| March 13
| @ Cleveland
| L 107-109 (OT)
| Byron Scott (28)
| Elden Campbell (9)
| Sedale Threatt (14)
| Richfield Coliseum20,273
| 33-30
|- style="background:#cfc;"
| 64
| March 14
| @ Washington
| W 92-89
| A.C. Green (19)
| Sam Perkins (13)
| Sedale Threatt (3)
| Capital Centre18,756
| 34-30
|- style="background:#fcc;"
| 65
| March 16
| @ Indiana
| L 85-98
| Vlade Divac (23)
| A.C. Green (13)
| Sedale Threatt (10)
| Market Square Arena14,490
| 34-31
|- style="background:#fcc;"
| 66
| March 18
| Portland
| L 93-98
| Sam Perkins (22)
| A.C. Green (11)
| Sedale Threatt (10)
| Great Western Forum17,505
| 34-32
|- style="background:#cfc;"
| 67
| March 20
| Minnesota
| W 131-121
| Terry Teagle (26)
| A.C. Green (9)
| Byron Scott (11)
| Great Western Forum16,291
| 35-32
|- style="background:#cfc;"
| 68
| March 26
| Dallas
| W 115-92
| Terry Teagle (28)
| Vlade Divac (11)
| Sedale Threatt (6)
| Great Western Forum17,324
| 36-32
|- style="background:#cfc;"
| 69
| March 27
| @ Utah
| W 103-92
| Terry Teagle (23)
| Divac & Green (10)
| Green & Threatt (4)
| Delta Center19,911
| 37-32
|- style="background:#cfc;"
| 70
| March 29
| Philadelphia
| W 117-88
| Vlade Divac (32)
| A.C. Green (12)
| Sedale Threatt (9)
| Great Western Forum17,505
| 38-32
|- style="background:#cfc;"
| 71
| March 31
| @ Houston
| W 107-101
| Campbell & Green (22)
| A.C. Green (16)
| Sedale Threatt (5)
| The Summit15,068
| 39-32

|- style="background:#fcc;"
| 72
| April 1
| @ San Antonio
| L 86-104
| Terry Teagle (20)
| Elden Campbell (11)
| Sedale Threatt (5)
| HemisFair Arena16,057
| 39-33
|- style="background:#fcc;"
| 73
| April 3
| Seattle
| L 91-96
| Sedale Threatt (28)
| Vlade Divac (12)
| Vlade Divac (5)
| Great Western Forum17,070
| 39-34
|- style="background:#cfc;"
| 74
| April 5
| Phoenix
| W 109-104
| Vlade Divac (30)
| Vlade Divac (13)
| Sedale Threatt (12)
| Great Western Forum17,228
| 40-34
|- style="background:#fcc;"
| 75
| April 7
| @ Seattle
| L 88-117
| Sedale Threatt (18)
| Elden Campbell (14)
| Sedale Threatt (5)
| Seattle Center Coliseum12,335
| 40-35
|- style="background:#fcc;"
| 76
| April 9
| San Antonio
| L 94-102
| Terry Teagle (18)
| A.C. Green (11)
| Tony Smith (7)
| Great Western Forum16,948
| 40-36
|- style="background:#fcc;"
| 77
| April 11
| Utah
| L 90-93
| Sedale Threatt (24)
| A.C. Green (10)
| Scott & Threatt (7)
| Great Western Forum17,176
| 40-37
|- style="background:#cfc;"
| 78
| April 13
| Denver
| W 100-93
| Terry Teagle (27)
| A.C. Green (10)
| Sedale Threatt (13)
| Great Western Forum17,137
| 41-37
|- style="background:#fcc;"
| 79
| April 15
| @ Denver
| L 107-110
| Vlade Divac (23)
| Sedale Threatt (8)
| Sedale Threatt (6)
| McNichols Sports Arena14,019
| 41-38
|- style="background:#fcc;"
| 80
| April 16
| @ Sacramento
| L 94-102
| Terry Teagle (27)
| A.C. Green (17)
| Sedale Threatt (10)
| ARCO Arena17,014
| 41-39
|- style="background:#cfc;"
| 81
| April 18
| @ Portland
| W 109-101
| Vlade Divac (25)
| A.C. Green (13)
| Sedale Threatt (12)
| Memorial Coliseum12,888
| 42-39
|- style="background:#cfc;"
| 82
| April 19
| L.A. Clippers
| W 109-108 (OT)
| Byron Scott (27)
| A.C. Green (12)
| Sedale Threatt (6)
| Great Western Forum17,505
| 43-39

Playoffs

|- style="background:#fcc;"
| 1
| April 23
| @ Portland
| L 102–115
| Scott & Teagle (22)
| A.C. Green (10)
| Byron Scott (5)
| Memorial Coliseum12,888
| 0–1
|- style="background:#fcc;"
| 2
| April 25
| @ Portland
| L 79–101
| Byron Scott (16)
| Elden Campbell (12)
| Divac & Sparrow (4)
| Memorial Coliseum12,888
| 0–2
|- style="background:#cfc;"
| 3
| April 29
| Portland
| W 121–119 (OT)
| Terry Teagle (26)
| A.C. Green (10)
| Sedale Threatt (6)
| Great Western Forum16,690
| 1–2
|- style="background:#fcc;"
| 4
| May 3
| Portland
| L 76–102
| Sedale Threatt (17)
| A.C. Green (14)
| 3 players tied (4)
| Thomas & Mack Center15,478
| 1–3

Player statistics

NOTE: Please write the players statistics in alphabetical order by last name.

Season

Playoffs

Magic’s retirement
Starting point guard Magic Johnson missed the first three games with an unspecified "stomach ailment". On November 7, 1991, Johnson announced that he had tested positive for HIV and would immediately retire. Johnson discovered his condition after attempting to purchase life insurance and failing the HIV test conducted by Lakers team doctor. During the press conference, he stated that his wife Cookie and unborn child were HIV negative and that he would become an advocate for HIV education and prevention. The NBA world was shocked; U. S. president George H. W. Bush said: "For me, Magic is a hero, a hero for anyone who loves sports." Johnson was still listed on the roster, as an injured reserve, and continued to be paid.

Johnson was voted in on the West team for the 1992 NBA All-Star Game. Columnists and other people speculated on whether he would play. Because HIV is spread through blood, some players voiced concerns about being infected if Johnson were to get a bleeding wound and touch them. Utah Jazz forward Karl Malone was the most vocal player to express concern. Nevertheless, Johnson played in the All-Star Game, leading the West to a 153-113 win and being named the All-Star Most Valuable Player (MVP). The game ended with 14.5 seconds remaining; when Johnson drained a last-minute three-pointer, other players ran on the court to congratulate Johnson and exchange high-fives. It would be Johnson's last game until he made a brief return at the end of the 1995–96 season.

Magic and the Dream Team
Despite being HIV positive, Johnson was chosen for the US team for the 1992 Summer Olympics. The squad was quickly dubbed the Dream Team because of its abundance of NBA stars such as Jordan, Karl Malone and Bird, but Johnson was the main attraction. At the Olympic Opening Ceremony, German tennis player Steffi Graf ordered colleague Barbara Rittner to photograph her with Johnson, and in the match against Spain, Spanish captain Juan Antonio San Epifanio and his squad demonstratively hugged him, showing that his HIV infection did not matter to them. During the tournament, Johnson struggled with knee problems and played for only a fraction of the games. The point guard position was mostly run by Utah Jazz all-time assist leader John Stockton, but Johnson's presence alone was enough to provoke standing ovations from the crowd. He used the spotlight to attempt to inspire HIV positive people in several interviews.

Awards and Records
 Magic Johnson, NBA All-Star Game Most Valuable Player Award
 Magic Johnson, J. Walter Kennedy Citizenship Award

Transactions

References

 Lakers on Database Basketball

Los Angeles Lakers seasons
Los Angle
Los Angle
Los Angle